Heinrich Hermann Josef Freiherr von Heß (alternatively: von Hess) (17 March 1788, Vienna – 13 April 1870, Vienna), was an Austrian soldier and field marshal, who entered the army in 1805 and was soon employed as a staff officer on survey work.

He distinguished himself as a subaltern at Aspern and Wagram, and in 1813, as captain, again served on the staff. In 1815, he was with Karl Philipp, Prince of Schwarzenberg. He had, in the interval between the two wars, been employed as a military commissioner in Piedmont, and at the peace resumed this post, gaining knowledge which later prover invaluable to the Austrian army.

In 1831, when Radetzky became commander-in-chief in Austrian Italy, he took Heß as his chief of staff. This began the connection between two famous soldiers which, like that of Blücher and Gneisenau, is a classical example of harmonious co-operation between commander and chief of staff. Heß put into shape Radetzky's military ideas, in the form of new drill for each army, and, under their guidance, the Austrian army in North Italy, always on a war footing, became the best in Europe. From 1834 to 1848 Heß was employed in Moravia, at Vienna, etc., but, on the outbreak of revolution and war in the latter year, he was at once sent out to Radetzky as chief of staff.

In the two campaigns against King Charles Albert which followed, culminating in the victory of Novara, Heß's assistance to his chief was made still more valuable by his knowledge of the enemy, and the old field-marshal acknowledged his services in general orders. Lieut.-Fieldmarshal Heß was at once promoted Feldzeugmeister, made a member of the emperor's council, and Freiherr von Heß assumed at the same time the duties of quartermaster-general. Next year he became chief of the staff to the emperor.

He was often employed in missions to various capitals, and he appeared in the field in 1854 at the head of the Austrian army which intervened so effectually in the Crimean War. In 1859 he was sent to the Second Italian War of Independence after the early defeats. He became field-marshal in 1860, and a year later, on resigning his position as chief of staff, he was made captain of the Trabant guard. He died in Vienna in 1870.

Orders and decorations

Notes

References

External links 

 
 "Heß, Heinrich Freiherr von". In Biographisches Lexikon des Kaisertums Österreich, Vol. 8, Vienna 1862. Online-Version] 

19th-century Austrian military personnel
Field marshals of Austria
Barons of Austria
Military personnel from Vienna
1788 births
1870 deaths
Commanders Cross of the Military Order of Maria Theresa
Grand Crosses of the Order of Saint Stephen of Hungary
Recipients of the Pour le Mérite (military class)
Commanders of the Order of Saints Maurice and Lazarus
Knights Grand Cross of the Order of St Gregory the Great
Recipients of the Order of St. Anna, 1st class
Recipients of the Order of St. Vladimir, 4th class
Recipients of the Order of St. George of the Second Degree
Recipients of the Order of the White Eagle (Russia)